Hardin is a city in Liberty County, Texas, United States. Its population was 768 at the 2020 census.

Geography

Hardin is located at  (30.150170, –94.736631).

Demographics

As of the 2020 United States census, there were 768 people, 302 households, and 183 families residing in the city.

As of the census of 2000,  819 people, 291 households, and 219 families wereresiding in the city. The population density was 329.4 peoplesq mi (127.3/km2). The 305 housing units had an average density of 133.1/sq mi (51.4/km2). The racial makeup of the city was 98.54% White, 0.53% African American, 0.13% Asian, 0.66% from other races, and 0.13% from two or more races. Hispanics or Latinos of any race were 4.11% of the population.

Of the 291 households,  34.4% had children under 18 living with them, 62.9% were married couples living together, 8.9% had a female householder with no husband present, and 24.7% were not families. About 22.7% of all households were made up of individuals, and 12.4% had someone living alone who was 65 or older. The average household size was 2.59, and the average family size was 3.03.

In the city, the age distribution as 26.0% under  18, 9.1% from 18 to 24, 26.0% from 25 to 44, 24.6% from 45 to 64, and 14.3% who were 65 or older. The median age was 38 years. For every 100 females, there were 99.2 males. For every 100 females age 18 and over, there were 95.5 males.

The median income for a household in the city was $41,016, and for a family was $47,500. Males had a median income of $36,964 versus $19,583 for females. The per capita income for the city was $18,445. About 6.9% of families and 8.7% of the population were below the poverty line, including 10.2% of those under age 18 and 11.0% of those age 65 or over.

Education
The city is served by the Hardin Independent School District. Residents of Hardin ISD are zoned to Lee College.

References

External links

Cities in Liberty County, Texas
Cities in Texas
Greater Houston